88 Rue du Rhone was an independent brand of Swiss made watches, launched in 2012 by Elie and Pierre Bernheim, grandsons of the Swiss watchmaker Raymond Weil. As of 2020, the watchmaker was no longer in business after being declared bankrupt in November 2016.

The name "Rue du Rhone" was inspired from Geneva's street Rue du Rhône as well as the Rhône that runs through the heart of the city.

Watch collections

Promotional activities
In 2014, 88 Rue du Rhone was the official watch partner for the Miami International Film Festival.

88 Rue du Rhone was the Official Watch & Timing Partner of the British Academy of Film and Television Arts (BAFTA) and the Miami International Film Festival (MIFF).

88 Rue du Rhone also sponsored the inaugural Past Forward BAFTA Art Exhibition.

References

External links
 

Swiss watch brands
Watch manufacturing companies of Switzerland
Design companies established in 2012
2012 establishments in Switzerland